Uwe Sauer (born 30 August 1943) is a German equestrian and Olympic champion. He was born in Hamburg. He won a gold medal in team dressage at the 1984 Summer Olympics in Los Angeles with Montevideo.

Montevideo and Sauer competed in the 1983 European Championships, where they took an individual bronze and helped the West German team to back-to-back team golds in the 1983 and 1985 European Championships. The pair also competed at the 1984 Olympics in Los Angeles, where they took a team gold and 6th individually. Other major accomplishments include a team gold and an individual silver at the 1984 German Championships and an individual silver at the 1985 German Championships.

References

1943 births
Living people
Sportspeople from Hamburg
German dressage riders
Olympic equestrians of West Germany
German male equestrians
Olympic gold medalists for West Germany
Equestrians at the 1984 Summer Olympics
Olympic medalists in equestrian
Medalists at the 1984 Summer Olympics